Ali Tabatabaei (1869–1947) was an Iranian alim (Islamic scholar) and mystic.

Ali Tabatabaei may also refer to:

Ali Tabatabaei (actor) (1983–2015), Iranian film and television actor
Ali Tabatabaee (born 1973), Iranian-American singer, lead singer of the band Zebrahead

See also
Ali Akbar Tabatabaei (1930–1980), Iranian political activist in exile and former press attache to the Iranian embassy in the United States
Ali Haider Tabatabai (Syed Ali Hyder Nazm Tabatabai, 1854–1933), Indian poet, translator and scholar of languages
Mohammad Ali Qazi Tabatabaei (1914–1979), Iranian Shiite cleric, politician, first imam Jumu'ah for Tabriz and Representative of the Supreme Leader in East Azerbaijan
Mohammad Ali Tabatabaei Hassani (1945–2017), Iraqi Twelver Shi'a Marja